Michel Le Milinaire (born 7 February 1931) is a French former football player and coach.

A defender, he played for Stade Lavallois and CA Mayennais.

After his playing career, he became a coach with Stade Lavallois and Stade Rennais.

Personal life
Le Milinaire is the grandfather of the footballer Martin Mimoun.

Managerial statistics

See also
 List of longest managerial reigns in association football

External links and references

External links
Profile

1931 births
Living people
Sportspeople from Côtes-d'Armor
French footballers
Footballers from Brittany
Association football defenders
Stade Lavallois players
French football managers
Ligue 1 managers
Stade Lavallois managers
Stade Rennais F.C. managers